Greensboro Bend is a census-designated place in the town of Greensboro, Orleans County, Vermont, United States. Its population was 232 as of the 2010 census.

References

Census-designated places in Vermont
Census-designated places in Orleans County, Vermont